New Prairie High School is a public high school located in Wills Township, Indiana operated by New Prairie United School Corporation.

Athletics 
New Prairie High School participates in the Northern Indiana Athletic Conference (NIC), a high school athletic conference. The conference comprises teams across St. Joseph County and New Prairie in LaPorte County. The High School's Team name is Cougars, and their major rival is  LaPorte High School.

See also 
 List of high schools in Indiana

References

External links
 Official Website

 Buildings and structures in LaPorte County, Indiana
 Public high schools in Indiana
 Schools in LaPorte County, Indiana